James Bever is an American biologist. He specializes in testing basic ecological and evolutionary processes occurring within plants and their associated fungi. He is currently the Distinguished Foundation Professor in Ecology and Evolutionary Biology at the University of Kansas, and is an Elected Fellow of the American Association for the Advancement of Science. His most cited papers are 700 and 590. He wrote several of the first papers on Plant-soil feedback.

References

Fellows of the American Association for the Advancement of Science
University of Kansas faculty
Living people
21st-century American biologists
Year of birth missing (living people)